Bresolettes is a former commune in the Orne department in the Basse-Normandie region in northwestern France. On 1 January 2016, it was merged into the new commune of Tourouvre au Perche.

Geography
Situated in a wooded area of the Perche province, the village is in the Clearing of Bresolettes, a site registered and protected since 1985.

Population

See also
Communes of the Orne department

References

Former communes of Orne